Charles Robert Mortimer Green (21 May 186310 April 1950) was a surgeon in the Indian Medical Service. He wrote a book on the Management of Children in India (1913).

References

External links 
 Management Of Children In India (1913)

1863 births
1950 deaths
English surgeons
Indian Medical Service officers